Yadira Pascault Orozco  is a French-Mexican actress and producer. She was the presenter of the rock n roll program called Sónicamente  on Canal Once (Mexico) and was the host of the cinema culture show El Once En El Cine  (also on Canal Once). As an actress she has worked on several different series on the Mexican channels Azteca (TV network) and Telemundo. She has appeared in five feature films, among them No eres tú, soy yo, Aquí Entre Nos  and Juego de Héroes.

Orozco also produces both theater and film. She was an associate producer of the feature films, Nosotros los Nobles (English: The Noble Family), El Cumple de la Abuela, No Eres Tu Soy Yo, Nosotros Los Nobles, Amor de mis Amores, 31 Días, Boogie El Aceitoso  Allá en el Rancho,   and was the principal producer of the play La Promesa (written by the Soviet playwright Aleksei Arbuzov, that ran at several different locations in Mexico City during 2013.
Two of the films with which Orozco has been involved are among the top ten all-time Mexican box office successes in history. In 2013, the comedy feature Nosotros los Nobles (The Noble Family) of which she was an associate producer rose to the number one ranking after taking in $165.3 million Mexican pesos, rising above even the revered Arráncame la vida (2008; $110 million Mexican pesos) and Y Tu Mamá También  (2000; $123 million pesos).
In 2010, after only a month in national cinemas, the romantic comedy No Eres Tu Soy Yo (of which Pascault Orozco was both an associate producer and an actress) collected more than $100 million Mexican pesos and became the fifth highest-grossing film in the history of Mexican cinema, according to a report published by the National Chamber of the Cinematographic and Videogram Industry.

The Muse

Orozco has been a muse for works of modern visual art and also literature. In 2016, the Mexican muralist Julio Carrasco Bretón depicted her face on a large scale wall painting created specifically for Hotel El Parque México in Mexico City. The lead character "Violeta" in the Mexican writer Xavier Velasco's novel, Diablo Guardián, was largely inspired by Pascault Orozco's personal character and speech patterns. The book won the Premio Alfaguara book award in 2003.

In mid-2016, after attending the opening of Perception - an exhibition by the New York contemporary artist Carole Feuerman at KM Fine Arts in Los Angeles - the artist invited Pascault Orozco to New York to become the subject of a full-sized hyper-realist sculpture.

The finished result, a life-sized sculpture entitled, The Midpoint, portraying Yadira Pascault Orozco (wearing a one-piece swimsuit and a bathing cap) made its debut in Feuerman's 2017 solo showing at Giardino della Marinaressa, part of the 2017 Venice Biennale. Later in 2020, the sculpture was a focal point of an arts debate about the piece and its place in Tübingen, Germany involving mayor Boris Palmer and prominent members of the arts and culture community.

Filmography

Film

Theater

Television

References

External links

Living people
20th-century Mexican actresses
21st-century Mexican actresses
Mexican film actresses
Mexican television actresses
Mexican people of French descent
Mexican film producers
Mexican stage actresses
Mexican television presenters
Year of birth missing (living people)
Actresses from Mexico City
Mexican women television presenters